The 1961 Little All-America college football team is composed of college football players from small colleges and universities who were selected by the Associated Press (AP) as the best players at each position. For 1961, the AP selected three teams of 11 players each, with no separate defensive platoons.

Running back Leroy Jackson of Western Illinois finished third in the NCAA in the 100-yard dash and was selected by the Cleveland Browns in the first round (11th overall pick) of the 1962 NFL Draft.

Back Joe Iacone of West Chester was the only junior selected for the first team.  He repeated as a first-team player in 1962.

First team
 Back - Leroy Jackson (senior, 6'1", 190 pounds), Western Illinois
 Back - Bobby Jancik (senior, 5'10", 170 pounds), Lamar Tech
 Back - Gary Snadon (senior, 6'0", 195 pounds), Pittsburg State
 Back - Joe Iacone (junior, 5'11", 185 pounds), West Chester
 End - Drew Roberts (senior, 6'1", 190 pounds), Humboldt State
 End - Powell McClellan (senior, 6'2", 195 pounds), Arkansas Tech
 Tackle - Ray Jacobs (senior, 6'2", 270 pounds), Howard Payne
 Tackle - David Baxter (senior, 6'1", 215 pounds), Tennessee Tech
 Guard - Dan Lewis (senior, 6'0", 230 pounds), Wofford
 Guard - Wendell Williams (senior, 6'1", 195 pounds), College of Iowa
 Center - Curtis Miranda (senior, 6'3", 235 pounds), Florida A&M

Second team
 Back - Carey Henley, Chattanooga
 Back - Donald Lee Smith, Langston
 Back - Sid Blanks, Texas A&I
 Back - Joe Thorne, South Dakota State
 End - Paul Blazevich, Omaha
 End - John Murlo, Whitworth
 Tackle - Frank Annweiler, Texas Lutheran
 Tackle - Dave Kemna, Wheaton
 Guard - Douglas Brown, Fresno State
 Guard - James Lightner, Coast Guard
 Center - Terry Fohs, Washington & Lee

Third team
 Back - Kenneth Fults, Tennessee Tech
 Back - Dennis Spurlock, Whitworth
 Back - Steve Beguin, Linfield 
 Back - Roy Curry, Jackson State
 End - John Budde, Carroll (Wisconsin)
 End - Stuart Hall, Willamette
 Tackle - John Lamoski, Western Michigan
 Tackle - Paul Abodeely, Amherst
 Guard - Al Sandona, Northern Michigan
 Guard - Charles Speleotis, Bowdoin
 Center - Michael Reilly, Williams

See also
 1961 College Football All-America Team

References

Little All-America college football team
Little All-America college football team
Little All-America college football teams